The stream of consciousness is a metaphor describing how thoughts seem to flow through the conscious mind. Research studies have shown that we only experience one mental event at a time as a fast-moving mind stream. The term was coined by Alexander Bain in 1855 in the first edition of The Senses and the Intellect, when he wrote, "The concurrence of Sensations in one common stream of consciousness (on the same cerebral highway) enables those of different senses to be associated as readily as the sensations of the same sense" (p. 359). But it is commonly credited to William James often considered to be the father of American psychology who used it in 1890 in his The Principles of Psychology. The full range of thoughts—that one can be aware of—can form the content of this stream.

Buddhism

Early Buddhist scriptures describe the "stream of consciousness" (Pali; viññāna-sota) where it is referred to as the Mind Stream. The practice of mindfulness, which is about being aware moment-to-moment of one's subjective conscious experience  aid one to directly experience the "stream of consciousness" and to gradually cultivate self-knowledge and wisdom.
Buddhist teachings describe the continuous flow of the "stream of mental and material events" that include sensory experiences (i.e., seeing, hearing, smelling, tasting, touch sensations, or a thought relating to the past, present or the future) as well as various mental events that get generated, namely, feelings, perceptions and intentions/behaviour. These mental events are also described as being influenced by other factors such as attachments and past conditioning. Further, the moment-by-moment manifestation of the "stream of consciousness" is described as being affected by physical laws, biological laws, psychological laws, volitional laws, and universal laws.

Proponents
In his lectures circa 1838–1839 Sir William Hamilton, 9th Baronet described "thought" as "a series of acts indissolubly connected"; this comes about because of what he asserted was a fourth "law of thought" known as the "law of reason and consequent":   
"The logical significance of the law of Reason and Consequent lies in this, – That in virtue of it, thought is constituted into a series of acts all indissolubly connected; each necessarily inferring the other" (Hamilton 1860:61-62).
In this context the words "necessarily infer" are synonymous with "imply". In further discussion Hamilton identified "the law" with modus ponens; thus the act of "necessarily infer" detaches the consequent for purposes of becoming the (next) antecedent in a "chain" of connected inferences.

William James asserts the notion as follows:
"Consciousness, then, does not appear to itself chopped up in bits. Such words as 'chain' or 'train' do not describe it fitly as it presents itself in the first instance. It is nothing jointed; it flows. A 'river' or a 'stream' are the metaphors by which it is most naturally described. In talking of it hereafter let us call it the stream of thought, of consciousness, or of subjective life. (James 1890:239)
He was enormously skeptical about using introspection as a technique to understand the stream of consciousness. "The attempt at introspective analysis in these cases is in fact like seizing a spinning top to catch its motion, or trying to turn up the gas quickly enough to see how the darkness looks." However, the epistemological separation of two levels of analyses appears to be important in order to systematically understand the "stream of consciousness."

Bernard Baars has developed Global Workspace Theory which bears some resemblance to stream of consciousness.

Conceptually understanding what is meant by the "present moment," "the past" and "the future" can aid one to systematically understand the "stream of consciousness."

Criticism
Susan Blackmore challenged the concept of stream of consciousness. "When I say that consciousness is an illusion I do not mean that consciousness does not exist. I mean that consciousness is not what it appears to be. If it seems to be a continuous stream of rich and detailed experiences, happening one after the other to a conscious person, this is the illusion." However, she also says that a good way to observe the "stream of consciousness" may be to calm the mind in meditation. The criticism is based on the stream of perception data from the senses rather than about consciousness itself. Also, it is not explained the reason why some things are conscious at all. Suggestions have also been made regarding the importance of separating "two levels of analyses" when attempting to understand the "stream of consciousness".

Baars is in agreement with these points. The continuity of the "stream of consciousness" may in fact be illusory, just as the continuity of a movie is illusory. Nevertheless, the seriality of mutually incompatible conscious events is well supported by objective research over some two centuries of experimental work. A simple illustration would be to try to be conscious of two interpretations of an ambiguous figure or word at the same time. When timing is precisely controlled, as in the case of the audio and video tracks of the same movie, seriality appears to be compulsory for potentially conscious events presented within the same 100 ms interval.

J. W. Dalton has criticized the global workspace theory on the grounds that it provides, at best, an account of the cognitive function of consciousness, and fails even to address the deeper problem of its nature, of what consciousness is, and of how any mental process whatsoever can be conscious: the so-called "hard problem of consciousness". A. C. Elitzur has argued, however, "While this hypothesis does not address the 'hard problem', namely, the very nature of consciousness, it constrains any theory that attempts to do so and provides important insights into the relation between consciousness and cognition.", as much as any consciousness theory is constrained by the natural brain perception limitations.

New work by Richard Robinson shows promise in establishing the brain functions involved in this model and may help shed light on how we understand signs or symbols and  reference these to our semiotic registers.

Literary technique

In literature, stream of consciousness writing is a literary device which seeks to portray an individual's point of view by giving the written equivalent of the character's thought processes, either in a loose interior monologue, or in connection to his or her sensory reactions to external occurrences. Stream-of-consciousness as a narrative device is strongly associated with the modernist movement. The term was first applied in a literary context, transferred from psychology, in The Egoist, April 1918, by May Sinclair, in relation to the early volumes of Dorothy Richardson's novel sequence Pilgrimage. Amongst other modernist novelists who used it are James Joyce in Ulysses (1922) and William Faulkner in The Sound and the Fury (1929).

See also
 Edmund Husserl
 Free recall
 Phenomenology (psychology)
 Qualia
 Samyama
 Teletransportation paradox
 Train of thought

References

Consciousness studies
Cognition